Wallabi Point is a coastal town in New South Wales, Australia in Mid-Coast Council.

References

Mid North Coast
Coastal towns in New South Wales
Towns in New South Wales
Beaches of New South Wales
Suburbs of Mid-Coast Council
Surfing locations in New South Wales